The Battle of Heavenfield was fought in 633 or 634 between a Northumbrian army under Oswald of Bernicia and a Welsh army under Cadwallon ap Cadfan of Gwynedd. The battle resulted in a decisive Northumbrian victory. The Annales Cambriae (Annals of Wales) record the battle as Bellum Cantscaul in 631. Bede referred to it as the Battle of Deniseburna near Hefenfelth.

Background
An alliance between Cadwallon of Gwynedd and King Penda of Mercia had led to an invasion of Northumbria. This was an odd alliance between a Christian king of Brythonic descent and a pagan king of Anglian descent. At the Battle of Hatfield Chase on 12 October 633, the invading Welsh and Mercians had killed Northumbrian king Edwin and Northumbria was split between its two sub-kingdoms, Bernicia and Deira. Cadwallon's army laid waste to Northumbria.

Eanfrith, who had been exiled under Edwin, became king of Bernicia, whilst Deira was ruled by Osric, a cousin of Edwin. Eanfrith's reign was short, as he was killed by Cadwallon whilst trying to negotiate peace. According to Bede, Osric was killed by Cadwallon whilst trying to besiege him. Eanfrith's brother, Oswald, then returned from seventeen years of exile in Dál Riata to claim the crown of Northumbria. However, the threat of Cadwallon lingered and Oswald had to raise an army as soon as possible to deal with his invading force.

The battle
It seems that the Welsh army advanced northward from York along the line of Dere Street. It was claimed that the night before the battle, Oswald had a vision of Saint Columba, in which the saint foretold that Oswald would be victorious. Oswald placed his army so that it was facing east, with its flanks shielded by Brady's Crag to the north and the Wall to the south. According to Bede, Oswald raised a cross, and prayed for victory alongside his troops.

It is believed that the Welsh had greater numbers, but they were forced to attack from the east along the narrow front between the Wall and Brady's Crag, where they were hemmed in and unable to outflank the Northumbrians. It is not known how long the battle lasted or what the losses were, but the Welsh line finally broke. This began a headlong flight southward by the Welsh, pursued by the vengeful Northumbrians. Many Welsh soldiers were cut down as they ran, and according to Bede, Cadwallon was caught around 16 km south of Heavenfield and killed at a place called Denisesburna ('Brook of Denisus'), now identified as the Rowley Burn (sometimes Rowley Brook) near Whitley Chapel.

The battle was a decisive victory for Oswald, and it was likely that the Welsh losses were substantial. Afterwards, due to the miraculous victory by Oswald's smaller force, the main battle site became known as Heavenfield (Heofenfeld) and became a place of pilgrimage for Christians at the time.

Aftermath
After the battle, Oswald re-united Deira with Bernicia and became king of all Northumbria. Bede believed that the importance of the battle was that it restored Christianity to Northumbria. Oswald spent eight years upon the Northumbrian throne before he was killed in the Battle of Maserfield. Oswald was succeeded as king of Northumbria by his brother Oswiu.

The site today

The road east of Chollerford that runs alongside the Roman Wall (B6318) has a wooden cross standing alongside it to mark the site of the Battle of Heavenfield. On the hill to the north of the cross stands St Oswald's Church, Heavenfield, marking the spot where Oswald was believed to have raised his battle standard. The site is around 4.5 km east of the River North Tyne.

Another possibility is near Devil's Water, as per Max Adams; Bede names the site as Denisesburn, now known to be close to Devil's Water, per a 1233 charter to Thomas of Whittington discovered in 1864 (Tom Corfe, 1997). Adams posits that the battle began on the east bank of Devil's Water, moving to the ford at Peth Foot.

References

 Sadler, John. Battle for Northumbria, 1988, Bridge Studios, (pages 25–29) 
 Marsden, John. Northanhymbre Saga, 1992, Kyle Cathie Limited, (pages 113–117) 

 Adams, Max. The King in the North, 2013, Head of Zeus, (pages 156-158) 
 Marc, Morris. The Anglo-Saxons, a history of the beginning of England, 2021
Bede. Baedae Historia ecclesiastica gentis Anglorum, 731

Heavenfield
630s
7th century in England
Heavenfield
Heavenfield
Heavenfield
Heavenfield
Heavenfield
634
7th century in Scotland
7th century in Wales